Eden Landing Ecological Reserve is a nature reserve in Hayward and Union City, California, on the eastern shore of San Francisco Bay. The reserve is managed by the California Department of Fish and Game and comprises 5,040 acres of former industrial salt ponds now used as a low salinity waterbird habitat.

Background
The reserve lies between the Hayward Regional Shoreline and Alameda Creek Regional Trail to the north and adjacent to Don Edwards National Wildlife Refuge and Coyote Hills Regional Park to the south and is south and adjacent to the San Mateo–Hayward Bridge, across which lies the Hayward Shoreline Interpretive Center. Some waterfowl hunting is periodically permitted. The remains of the Oliver Salt Company are located in the reserve.

This is part of the organization's South Bay Salt Pond Restoration Project, which is the largest salt pond restoration project on the west coast of the United States. To date, over 1,000 acres of marsh have been restored, many of the former salt ponds have been enhanced for wildlife, and new trails and a kayak launch were opened to the public in April 2016.  The Bay Area environmental organization Save the Bay is also working on the site to plant native vegetation along the edges of the salt marshes.

Further reading

See also

List of California Department of Fish and Game protected areas
Eden Landing, local former community from which its name is derived

References

External links
 
 
 
 

Nature reserves in California
Bird sanctuaries of the United States
Parks in Hayward, California
Union City, California
Protected areas of Alameda County, California
Protected areas of the San Francisco Bay Area
California State Reserves
California Department of Fish and Wildlife areas
Marshes of California
Ecological restoration
History of salt
Environment of the San Francisco Bay Area
San Francisco Bay
San Francisco Bay Trail